Deities formed a part of the polytheistic religious beliefs in pre-Islamic Arabia, with many of the deities' names known. Up until about the fourth century AD, polytheism was the dominant form of religion in Arabia. Deities represented the forces of nature, love, death, and so on, and were interacted to by a variety of rituals.

Formal pantheons are more noticeable at the level of kingdoms, of variable sizes, ranging from simple city-states to collections of tribes. The Kaaba alone was said to have contained up to 100 images of many gods and goddesses. Tribes, towns, clans, lineages and families had their own cults too. Christian Julien Robin suggests that this structure of the divine world reflected the society of the time.

Many deities did not have proper names and were referred to by titles indicating a quality, a family relationship, or a locale preceded by "he who" or "she who" (dhū or dhāt).

Pantheons and groupings

Alphabetical list

Notes

References

Citations

Sources 

 
 

 
Arabian